Hobbie Ridge is a bold ridge that projects from the middle of the head of Meander Glacier,  south of Mount Supernal, in Victoria Land, Antarctica. It was mapped by the United States Geological Survey from surveys and U.S. Navy air photos, 1960–64, and was named by the Advisory Committee on Antarctic Names for John E. Hobbie, a biologist at McMurdo Station 1962–63.

References

Ridges of Victoria Land
Borchgrevink Coast